Calamotropha bicepellum is a moth in the family Crambidae. It was described by Shi-Mei Song in 2002. It is found in Guangdong, China.

References

Crambinae
Moths described in 2002